Yasuda Station (安田駅) is the name of two train stations in Japan:

 Yasuda Station (Kōchi)
 Yasuda Station (Niigata)